Mạc Hồng Quân (born 1 January 1992) is a Vietnamese footballer who is an attacking midfielder for Topeland Bình Định and the Vietnam national football team.

Early life
Born in Hải Dương, Hong Quan migrated to Czech Republic with his family in 2000 at the age of 8.

Club career

AC Sparta Prague B
Hồng Quân began his professional career with the B squad of AC Sparta Prague. He captained the club during 2011-2012.

FLC Thanh Hoa
Hồng Quân made his highly anticipated debut in the V.League 1 when he signed with FLC Thanh Hóa before Matchday 12 of the 2013 season. However, after a poor start to the 2014 V.League 1 season, Thanh Hóa released Hồng Quân.

Hung Vuong An Giang

International career
In June 2012, Mạc Hồng Quân was invited to train with the Vietnam U22 by the Vietnam Football Federation after being scouted by the Vietnam U19's coach Mai Đức Chung. He was selected for the final roster for the 2013 AFC U-22 Championships qualifiers.

On 15 September 2014, the underdogs Vietnam thrash Iran 4-1 in shock win in the men's football event of the 2014 Asian Games. Hong Quan assisted the first and scored the second goal after passing two Iran defenders before defeating goalkeeper Sedghi. He was praised by the Vietnamese media for his movement and ability to find space in dangerous areas.

Hong Quan was part of Vietnam's squad in the 2014 AFF Championship.

International goals
Scores and results list Vietnam's goal tally first.

Under-23

Vietnam
Scores and results list Vietnam's goal tally first.

Honours

International

Vietnam U23
 Third place : Southeast Asian Games: 2015

Personal life 

Mạc Hồng Quân began dating Vietnamese model Kỳ Hân in early 2016. The couple got married on June 26, 2016. Their first child, a son, Tỏi, was born in 2017.

See also
 List of Vietnam footballers born outside Vietnam

References

External links
 
 

1992 births
Living people
Vietnamese footballers
Association football midfielders
Vietnam international footballers
Vietnamese expatriate footballers
Vietnamese emigrants to the Czech Republic
Vietnamese expatriate sportspeople in the Czech Republic
People from Hải Dương province
Than Quang Ninh FC players
Footballers at the 2014 Asian Games
Southeast Asian Games bronze medalists for Vietnam
Southeast Asian Games medalists in football
Competitors at the 2015 Southeast Asian Games
Asian Games competitors for Vietnam